{{Speciesbox
|image = Carexleptalea.jpg
|taxon = Carex leptalea
|authority = Wahlenb.
|synonyms = Carex microstachysCarex polytrichoidesCarex harperi
}}Carex leptalea is a species of sedge known by the common names bristly-stalked sedge and flaccid sedge. It is native to much of North America including most of Canada, the Dominican Republic, and the United States. It only grows in wetlands. This sedge produces dense clusters of thin stems up to 70 centimeters tall from a network of branching rhizomes. The thin, deep green leaves are soft, hairless, and sometimes drooping. The inflorescence is up to 16 millimeters long but only 2 to 3 millimeters wide, and is yellow-green in color. There are only a few perigynia on each spikelet, and they are green and veined.

SubspeciesCarex leptalea subsp. harperi (Fernald) W.Stone - southeastern US from Texas and Florida north to Missouri and PennsylvaniaCarex leptalea subsp. leptalea - widespread from Alaska east to Nunavut and south to California and Dominican RepublicCarex leptalea subsp. pacifica'' Calder & Roy L.Taylor - Washington State, British Columbia, southeastern Alaska

References

External links
Jepson Manual Treatment
USDA Plants Profile
Flora of North America
Carex leptalea: A Technical Conservation Assessment
Photo gallery

leptalea
Plants described in 1803
Flora of North America